The 2017 Jacksonville State Gamecocks football team represented Jacksonville State University as a member of the Ohio Valley Conference (OVC) during the 2017 NCAA Division I FCS football season. Led by fourth-year head coach John Grass, the Gamecocks compiled an overall record of 10–2 with a mark of 8–0 in conference play, winning the OVC title for the fourth consecutive season. Jacksonville State received the OVC's automatic bid to the NCAA Division I Football Championship playoffs as the No. 3 overall seed, marking the program's fifth straight trip to the FCS playoffs. After a first-round, the Gamecocks were upset by Kennesaw State in the second round. The team played home games at Burgess–Snow Field at JSU Stadium in Jacksonville, Alabama.

On October 14, the Gamecocks won their 27th straight OVC conference game, setting the conference record for consecutive games won.

Previous season
The Gamecocks finished the 2016 season 10–2, 7–0 in OVC play to win the conference championship. As a result, they received the conference's automatic bid to the FCS Playoffs where they lost in the second round to Youngstown State.

Schedule

Ranking movements

Game summaries

vs Chattanooga

at Georgia Tech

Liberty

at Tennessee Tech

at Austin Peay

Eastern Kentucky

at Eastern Illinois

Southeast Missouri State

Murray State

at UT Martin

Tennessee State

Kennesaw State—NCAA Division I Second Round

References

Jacksonville State
Jacksonville State Gamecocks football seasons
Ohio Valley Conference football champion seasons
Jacksonville State
Jacksonville State Gamecocks football